Seaford railway station is located on the Frankston line in Victoria, Australia. It serves the south-eastern Melbourne suburb of Seaford, and it opened on 1 December 1913.

A substation is located at the northern (Up) end of the station.

History

Seaford station opened on 1 December 1913 and, like the suburb itself, is named after the English town of Sleaford, Lincolnshire. The name was suggested by local councillor Sydney Plowman, who was originally from Sleaford.

On 13 November 1957, an electric locomotive that was shunting in the yard derailed, blocking both lines for almost two hours.

Just before 18:00 on June 5 1968, Tait trailer carriages 336T and 307T were damaged by fire whilst stabled near the station.

In 1976, boom barriers replaced interlocked gates at the Station Street level crossing, located at the Up end of the station. On 4 February 1979, Tait motor carriage 288M was destroyed by fire whilst stabled near the station. Also in that year, the current station buildings were provided.

During the 1970s and 1980s, the station used to accommodate stabled trains within its sidings. The use of the sidings was discontinued during the late 1980s due to costs and graffiti. The tracks used to stable trains are still visible at the southern (Down) end of the station. By December 1985, the goods yard at the station was closed to traffic.

In 2009, the car park nearest to Platform 2 was extended.

On 4 May 2010, as part of the 2010/2011 State Budget, $83.7 million was allocated to upgrade Seaford to a Premium Station, along with nineteen others. However, in March 2011, this was scrapped by the Baillieu Government.

Following a 2019 commitment by the Morrison Government, the station was due to receive an upgraded commuter car park. However, this was scrapped by the same government in 2021.

Announced in October 2022, Seaford will be elevated to remove 7 level crossings on the line. Further details, designs and a construction timeline will be released closer to the opening of the station in 2029.

Platforms and services

Seaford has two side platforms. It is serviced by Metro Trains' Frankston line services.

Platform 1:
  all stations and limited express services to Flinders Street, Werribee and Williamstown

Platform 2:
  all stations services to Frankston

Transport links

Ventura Bus Lines operates two routes via Seaford station, under contract to Public Transport Victoria:
 : to Cranbourne station
 : Frankston station – Carrum station

Gallery

References

External links
 Melway map at street-directory.com.au

Railway stations in Melbourne
Railway stations in Australia opened in 1913
Railway stations in the City of Frankston